Yan Hui; was a late 13th-century Chinese painter who lived during the Southern Song and early Yuan dynasties. His specific dates of birth and death are not known. His exquisite brushstrokes were highly regarded.

Biography

Yan Hui was born in Ji'an, Jiangxi province. His courtesy name was Qiuyue (秋月; lit. "autumn moon"). Yan primarily painted human, Buddhist, and ghost figures. His style incorporated profound brush strokes with special composition.

Notable works of Yan Hui 
 中山出猎图 ("Zhongshan goes hunting")
 李仙像 ("Li Xianxiang")
 戏猿图 ("Plays the Ape")

Gallery

Notes

References

 Ci hai bian ji wei yuan hui. Ci hai . Shanghai: Shanghai ci shu chu ban she , 1979.

Song dynasty painters
Yuan dynasty painters
Year of death unknown
People from Ji'an
Painters from Jiangxi
Year of birth unknown
Buddhist artists